International Journal of Energy Research is a monthly peer-reviewed scientific journal published by John Wiley & Sons. Its scope includes fossil, nuclear, and renewable energy sources, and research into energy storage. It was established in 1977 and the editor-in-chief is Ibrahim Dincer (University of Ontario Institute of Technology).

Abstracting and indexing 
The journal is abstracted and indexed in:

According to the Journal Citation Reports, the journal has a 2020 impact factor of 5.164.

References

External links 
 

English-language journals
Monthly journals
Publications established in 1977
Energy and fuel journals
Wiley (publisher) academic journals
Energy research